Abdul Hakim (4 December 1949 – 28 August 2022) was a Bangladeshi football player. He payed for the first ever Bangladesh national football team and was in the starting XI during the country's first official game. He was also a member of the Shadhin Bangla football team during the Bangladesh Liberation War.

Club career
Hakim moved to Jessore in 1963 and completed his HSC examination from MM College, in  1968. In 1965, he became the inter-school Khulna divisional champion for Jessore Model High School. That same year he played for the Jessore district football team. He joined Khulna Jute Mills in 1968 as a football player, and became the only player from Jessore to participate in the East Pakistan Youth Team. He played for East Pakistan Combined University team in 1969. He joined Dilkusha SC in the Dhaka Second Division League, in 1968 and earned promotion to the Dhaka League within his first season. In 1970, he joined EPIDC, which was renamed as BIDC and later BJMC after the Independence of Bangladesh. With BJMC, he won the Dhaka League in both 1970 and 1973. His retired in 1978, while playing for Wari Club Dhaka.

International career
During the 1971 Bangladesh Liberation War, Hakim played exhibition matches with the Shadhin Bangla football team, in India. He played against teams from various parts of India, including Prayagraj, Bihar, Varanasi and Punjab. He played for Bangladesh XI against Dhaka XI, in the first official football match in independent Bangladesh, on 13 February 1972. Hakim was also part of the Dhaka XI team that defeated Mohun Bagan AC 1–0 at the Dhaka Stadium, on 13 May 1972. 

During the latter stages of 1972, he travelled to India with the Dhaka XI (unofficial Bangladesh national team, as the country was not a FIFA or AFC member yet), to take part in the Bordoloi Trophy, held in Guwahati. Although he was a second choice left-back to the late Ainul Haque, coach Sheikh Shaheb Ali later transitioned Hakim into a starter. The coach also selected him for the first Bangladesh national football team, following year, after Bangladesh joined AFC. He made his debut against Thailand, as the starting left-back in the Merdeka Cup, held in Malaysia. He also played the 1975 edition of the tournament, which was his last for Bangladesh.

Personal life
Hakim was bedridden since 2019, after suffering an Intracerebral hemorrhage and could not afford better treatment according to an interview his family gave. On 28 August 2022, he died while under treatment at the Dhaka Medical College Hospital, leaving behind a wife, a son and three daughters.

Honours
Dilkusha
Dhaka Second Division League = 1968
EPIDC
Dhaka League = 1970, 1973

References

Bibliography
 

1949 births
2022 deaths
Bangladeshi footballers
Bangladesh international footballers
Association football defenders
Team BJMC players
People from Barasat
Bangladeshi people of Indian descent